Marcia Mascotte Ralston (19 September 1906 – 23 November 1988) was an Australian-born actress who appeared in Hollywood films in the 1930s and 1940s.

In Australia
Ralston's father was well known Australian singer and actor John Ralston. She attended Bethlehem College, Ashfield and won third place in a 1926 Miss Australia competition. 
Known as Mascotte Ralston, she won a place in J. C. Williamson's Musical Comedy Company, working her way up from the chorus until she was playing Lili in Lilac Time. She had a leading part in the "comedy mystery" The Ghost Train from January 1927, and during its run she met drummer Phil Harris and they married on 2 September 1927, then moved to California. She had a Warner Bros. contract by 1937 and appeared in a number of supporting and leading roles, mostly in B films.

Career in Hollywood
Her marriage to Harris ended in divorce in 1940. She continued to act in various bit parts and supporting roles until the late 1940s. Work after this included instructing for the Arthur Murray dance studio in the early 1950s. She married Bud Henderson in 1954. Henderson's sister Betty was married to actor Robert Young. The connection resulted in an occasional supporting role as Nurse Donnelly in the TV series Marcus Welby, M.D. in the early 1970s. She died at Rancho Mirage, California in 1988.

Filmography

References

External links

1906 births
1988 deaths
Australian film actresses
Actresses from Sydney
20th-century Australian actresses
Australian expatriate actresses in the United States